Fatemeh Haghighatjoo (also spelled Haghighatjou and Haqiqatju) is an Iranian scholar and reformist politician who represented Tehran, Rey, Shemiranat and Eslamshahr in the Iranian Parliament from 2000 to 2004. She left Iran in 2005 and currently resides in the United States, where she serves as the CEO and co-founder of the 501(c)(3) organization Nonviolent Initiative for Democracy (NID).

Early life and education 
Haghighatjoo was born in 1968 in southern Tehran, the second of four daughters, and comes from a traditionalist middle-class family. She lost her father in an accident when she was 6, and was brought up by her mother as a practising Muslim. She attended University of Tehran and Tarbiat Modarres University, gaining a degree in psychology and holding a Ph.D. in family counseling. She was a student activist with the Office for Strengthening Unity.

Political career 
Haghighatjoo worked for Mohammad Khatami's presidential campaign, and joined Mosharekat party as a student leader. In 2000, she successfully ran for a seat in the Iranian Parliament and became the youngest female deputy.

An advocate of women's rights, reforms and democracy, she contributed proposing a bill to join Convention on the Elimination of All Forms of Discrimination Against Women. She was charged with Tahrif of the words of Ayatollah Khomeini and insulting Ali Khamenei in 2001 for what she said in a speech in Qazvin, eventually convicted of the latter charge and sentenced to ten months suspended imprisonment.

On 23 February 2004, she resigned from the parliament on the grounds that she is no longer able to keep her oath of office and as a sign of protest to "the incorrect, illegal and non-religious conduct of the appointed bodies [e.g. the Guardian Council and Judiciary] in recent years".

Professional career 
Haghighatjoo was a math teacher and then a counselor in a girls' high school, before being employed as a lecturer at University of Tehran and Shahid Beheshti University. She is also a former faculty member at the University of Massachusetts, Boston, and the University of Connecticut and has had fellowship positions at Kennedy School of Harvard University and Massachusetts Institute of Technology's Center for International Studies.

Views 
She self-identifies as feminist. She told The Boston Globe in 2009 that she entered Parliament believing Islam and democracy could coexist; she left office believing in “separation of mosque and state.’’

Personal life
Haghighatjoo married a parliamentary correspondent, when she was 31 and serving her second year as a lawmaker. In November 2003, she gave birth to a girl, Sara Tahavori.

References

Deputies of Tehran, Rey, Shemiranat and Eslamshahr
Iranian expatriate academics
Harvard Fellows
Iranian expatriates in the United States
University of Tehran alumni
Living people
Members of the 6th Islamic Consultative Assembly
People from Tehran
Members of the Women's fraction of Islamic Consultative Assembly
Office for Strengthening Unity members
Islamic Iran Participation Front politicians
Heads of youth wings of political parties in Iran
21st-century Iranian women politicians
21st-century Iranian politicians
Family therapists
Iranian psychologists
Iranian women psychologists
Iranian feminists
Iranian human rights activists
Iranian democracy activists
1968 births
Faculty of Letters and Humanities of the University of Tehran alumni
Women human rights activists